Nagar Mastan is a 2015 Bangladeshi film directed by Rakibul Islam Rakib and starring Pori Moni, Zayed Khan and Shahriaz. The supporting cast includes Misha Saudagar, Ali Raj, and Titan Chowdhury, for whom it is her debut film. The film was criticised for vulgar scenes and it was locked by censor board two times and edited many times, until a third time it was released by censor board.

Cast 
 Pori Moni
 Zayed Khan
 Shahriaz
 Rafsan
 Mizu Ahmed

Music
The film's music was composed by Emon Saha.

Release
The film released on 23 October 2015 in Bangladesh. According to Bangladesh-India joint venture pact, the film was released in 2017 to Kolkata, India whereas Haripada Bandwala (2016) was released in Bangladesh.

References

Bengali-language Bangladeshi films
Films scored by Emon Saha
2015 films
2010s Bengali-language films